The Wildeman River is a river in southern Papua province, Indonesia. It is a tributary of the Pulau River.

Geography
The river flows in the southern area of Papua with predominantly tropical rainforest climate (designated as Af in the Köppen-Geiger climate classification). The annual average temperature in the area is 21 °C. The warmest month is January, when the average temperature is around 24 °C, and the coldest is July, at 19 °C. The average annual rainfall is 6225 mm. The wettest month is May, with an average of 807 mm rainfall, and the driest is July, with 341 mm rainfall.

See also
List of rivers of Indonesia
List of rivers of Western New Guinea
Wildeman River Awyu (language)

References

Rivers of Papua (province)
Rivers of Indonesia